Declassified UK is an investigative journalism website founded in 2019 by Matt Kennard and Mark Curtis. It describes itself as "the leading website for in-depth analysis and exclusive news on British foreign policy, investigating the UK military, intelligence agencies and its most powerful corporations." It was initially hosted by the Daily Maverick, an independent online newspaper based in South Africa. It was briefly blacklisted by the Ministry of Defence in September 2020.

Declassified UK has been regulated by IMPRESS since June 2021.

History
Declassified UK was set up in 2019 by Matt Kennard and Mark Curtis and was at first hosted on the website of the Daily Maverick, an independent South African website, before launching a standalone website on 20 September 2021. Kennard is an investigative journalist and author who has previously written for news outlets such as The Guardian, the Financial Times, openDemocracy and The Intercept, usually focusing on Britain's role on the international stage. Curtis is a historian and journalist who has written extensively about post-Second World War period foreign policy of the British government, publishing numerous works on the subject. Declassifieds chief reporter is Phil Miller, an investigative journalist, author and filmmaker whose book Keenie Meenie explores the history of Keenie Meenie Services, a British mercenary organization.

Board members at Declassified include former Guardian associate foreign editor Victoria Brittain; South African MP Andrew Feinstein; and former Guardian security editor and defence correspondent Richard Norton-Taylor.

Exclusives
In August 2020, Declassified published a story about a British soldier, Ahmed Al-Batati, being investigated by the Royal Military Police for protesting UK arms sales to Saudi Arabia. British missiles, fighter jets and bombs have been used in the Saudi Arabian-led intervention in Yemen since 2015.

In November 2020, Declassified revealed that the United Kingdom had nearly 150 overseas military bases, hundreds more than the Ministry of Defence (MoD) had previously claimed.

In February 2021, it revealed that figures from the British royal family had had more than 200 meetings with leaders of "tyrannical" Middle Eastern monarchies since the start of the Arab Spring in February 2011. These included 44 meetings with the Bahraini House of Khalifa and 40 with the Saudi regime.

On 8 September 2021, in the wake of the final withdrawal of the United States troops from Afghanistan, Phil Miller reported that "a Cold War-era file on Margaret Thatcher's support for the Afghan mujahideen" was being censored by the UK government. This was despite the fact that the documents has become eligible for release to the National Archives under the 30-year rule.

On 3 January 2022, Richard Norton-Taylor reported that "British warships deployed to the South Atlantic after Argentina's invasion of the Falkland Islands in 1982" were armed with 31 nuclear depth charges. The story was later picked up by Argentine newspaper Clarín and British tabloid, the Daily Express.

Blacklisting
In August 2020, Declassified journalist Phil Miller, who wrote the piece about Ahmed Al-Batati, asked the MoD for comment. An MoD press officer responded by questioning what angle Miller's article was taking and claimed not to know much about Declassified; the officer later told Miller, "we no longer deal with your publication". Following this, the Council of Europe, the continent's leading human rights organisation, issued an alert warning of a serious breach of press freedom. In addition, the International Press Institute wrote a letter to the MoD and the Defence Secretary, Ben Wallace, asking them to clarify the reason for the blacklisting.

After the MoD issued an apology, Declassified editor Mark Curtis told Press Gazette: "We are looking at taking legal action against the MoD because we think they have certainly acted against the Civil Service Code, for example, and there may be other codes of conduct or other legal requirements that they might not be consistent with by telling us that." The National Union of Journalists called upon Wallace to intervene and an independent review was later ordered. The inquiry was headed by Tom Kelly, who was one of Tony Blair's Downing Street press spokespeople when Blair was Prime Minister. It found that MoD press officers believed their communications director had "sanctioned a blanket ban" on giving any comment to the website. Curtis said, "It is clear that Declassified was blacklisted, which is contrary to the way that public officials are required to deal with news organisations. The MoD should admit it and stop trying to let its most senior media official off the hook. The MoD is used to dealing mainly with compliant journalists who are happy to follow the official line. Declassified is different, and seeks instead to perform a public service by revealing what governments do."

References

External links
 

British political websites
Internet properties established in 2019
Investigative journalism
2019 establishments in the United Kingdom
Alternative journalism organizations
British news websites